The Patía River is a river in southwestern Colombia. The Patía River is the longest river on the Colombian Pacific Coast. The last  is navigable by boat.

Geography
The Patía River begins in the Department of Cauca south of the city of Popayán near the town of Timbío.  The source of the river begins in the gap between the West Andes and Central Andes very near the source of the Cauca River.

The Patía river flows westward from the Central massif of Colombia, cuts through the Western Cordillera and drains into the Pacific Ocean.
In its upper section it runs through cloud forests and montane forests. The central section of the river flows through the Patía Valley dry forests ecoregion.
The lower section to the west of the Western Cordillera flows through the Chocó jungles of the Pacific region.
The Patía is fed by the Quilcacé, Guachicono, Mayo, Juanambú, Pasto and Guaitara rivers.

An 1853 watercolor by Manuel María Paz shows a mestizo or indigenous family on horseback herding cattle in a field near the Patía River.

See also
 List of rivers of Colombia
 Pacific Region, Colombia

References

Rand McNally, The New International Atlas, 1993.

Rivers of Colombia